Paul Utke (born December 3, 1956) is an American politician and member of the Minnesota Senate. A member of the Republican Party of Minnesota, he represents District 2 in northwestern Minnesota.

Early life and career
Utke was born on December 3, 1956, and raised in North Dakota. He is an insurance broker and was elected to the Park Rapids City Council in 2008. He was chaired the Hubbard County Republicans and has served on boards of several local organizations. He owned a hardware store in Park Rapids for 16 years.

Minnesota Senate
Utke was first elected to the Minnesota Senate in 2016.

Personal life
Utke and his wife, Nancy, have two children and reside in Park Rapids.

References

External links

 Official Senate website
 Official campaign website

1956 births
Living people
Republican Party Minnesota state senators
Minnesota city council members
21st-century American politicians
People from Park Rapids, Minnesota